is a Prefectural Natural Park in northwest Kumamoto Prefecture, Japan. Established in 1955, the park spans the municipalities of Gyokutō, Kumamoto, and Tamana. The park derives its name from Mount Kinbō and encompasses Honmyōji, Ohagi gardens, and Mount Sanno.

See also
 National Parks of Japan

References

External links
  Map of Natural Parks of Kumamoto Prefecture

Parks and gardens in Kumamoto Prefecture
Protected areas established in 1955
1955 establishments in Japan